Aralida Hoovugalu is a 1991 Indian Kannada-language romantic drama film directed by Chi. Dattaraj, with screenplay, dialogues and lyrics written by Chi. Udaya Shankar. The film stars Shiva Rajkumar, Vidyashree and Chi Guru Dutt. Produced by Parvathamma Rajkumar under Vajreshwari combines, the film screened for over a hundred days in the cinema halls. The film was a remake of the Hindi film Jawani Diwani.

Cast 
 Shiva Rajkumar as Vijay
 Vidyashree as Sudha
 Chi Guru Dutt as Chandrakant
 Srinath
 K. S. Ashwath as college principal
 Thoogudeepa Srinivas
 Sihi Kahi Chandru
 Srilalitha
 Sathyabhama
 Master Vijay Raghavendra as Vijay's nephew

Soundtrack 
The soundtrack of the film was composed by Upendra Kumar.

References 

1991 films
1990s Kannada-language films
Indian romantic drama films
Kannada remakes of Hindi films
1991 romantic drama films
Films directed by Chi. Dattaraj